Jacques "Jacky" Simon (25 March 1941 – 5 December 2017) was a French footballer who played as a midfielder. He was part of France national team at the FIFA World Cup 1966.

External links
 
 

1941 births
2017 deaths
Sportspeople from Manche
French footballers
Footballers from Normandy
Association football midfielders
France international footballers
1966 FIFA World Cup players
Ligue 1 players
AS Cherbourg Football players
FC Nantes players
FC Girondins de Bordeaux players
Red Star F.C. players